Cameron Stones (born 5 January 1992) is a Canadian bobsledder. He competed in the four-man event at the 2018 Winter Olympics.

In January 2022, Stones was named in Canada's 2022 Olympic team. Stones would go onto win the bronze medal in the Four-man event.

On August 25, 2022, Stones announced his retirement from the sport.

References

External links

1992 births
Living people
Canadian male bobsledders
Olympic bobsledders of Canada
Bobsledders at the 2018 Winter Olympics
Bobsledders at the 2022 Winter Olympics
Sportspeople from Oshawa
Olympic bronze medalists for Canada
Olympic medalists in bobsleigh
Medalists at the 2022 Winter Olympics
20th-century Canadian people
21st-century Canadian people